Carl Schaukowitch (February 14, 1951 – October 22, 2015) was an American football guard. He played for the Denver Broncos in 1975.

He died on October 22, 2015, in Mitchellville, Maryland at age 64.

References

1951 births
2015 deaths
American football offensive guards
Penn State Nittany Lions football players
Denver Broncos players